Oxymeris senegalensis, common name : the faval auger, is a species of sea snail, a marine gastropod mollusc in the family Terebridae, the auger snails.

Description
The size of an adult shell varies between 35 mm and 165 mm.

Distribution
This species occurs in the Atlantic Ocean from South Morocco to Angola.

References

 Bouchet P. (1983 ["1982"]) Les Terebridae (Mollusca, Gastropoda) de l'Atlantique oriental. Bollettino Malacologico 18: 185–216.
 Bratcher T. & Cernohorsky W.O. (1987). Living terebras of the world. A monograph of the recent Terebridae of the world. American Malacologists, Melbourne, Florida & Burlington, Massachusetts. 240pp
 Gofas, S.; Afonso, J.P.; Brandào, M. (Ed.). (S.a.). Conchas e Moluscos de Angola = Coquillages et Mollusques d'Angola. [Shells and molluscs of Angola]. Universidade Agostinho / Elf Aquitaine Angola: Angola. 140 pp.
 Terryn Y. (2007). Terebridae: A Collectors Guide. Conchbooks & NaturalArt. 59pp + plates
 Prelle G. (2011) Una nuova Duplicaria dal Camerun. Malacologia Mostra Mondiale 70: 17–18
 Aubry U. (1999) Nuove terebre e antichi versi. Ancona: L'Informatore Piceno. 47 pp.
 Terryn Y. & Ryall P. (2014) West African Terebridae, with the description of a new species from the Cape Verde Islands. Conchylia 44(3–4): 27–47

External links
 Lamarck, J.-B. de. (1822). Histoire naturelle des animaux sans vertèbres, présentant les caractères généraux et particuliers de ces animaux, leur distribution, leurs classes, leurs familles, leurs genres, et la citation des principales espèces qui s'y rapportent; précédée d'une introduction offrant la détermination des caractères essentiels de l'animal, sa distinction du végétal et des autres corps naturel; enfin, l'exposition des principes fondamentaux de la zoologie. Tome septième. 711 pp. Paris (Lamarck)
 Kiener L.C. (1834–1841). Spécies général et iconographie des coquilles vivantes. Vol. 9. Famille des Purpurifères. Deuxième partie. Genres Colombelle, (Columbella), Lamarck, pp. 1–63, pl. 1-16 [pp. 1–63 (1841); pl. 2-4, 6, 8, 11 (1840), 1, 5, 7, 9–10, 12–16 (1841)]; Buccin (Buccinum), Adanson, pp. 1–112 + table with duplicate page numbers 105–108, pl. 1-31 [pp. 1–64 (1834), 65–104 and 105–108 of table (1835), 105–112 of text (1841); pl. 1-24 (1834), 25–29 (1835), 30–31 (1841); Eburne (Eburna), Lamarck, pp. 1–8, pl. 1-3 [all (1835)]; Struthiolaire (Struthiolaria), Lamarck, pp. 1–6, pl. 1-2 [pp]. 1–6 (1838); pl. 1-2 (1837)]; Vis (Terebra, Bruguière, pp. 1–42 + table, pl. 1-14 [pp. 1–42 (1838); pl. 1-14 (1837)]. Paris, Rousseau & J.B. Baillière
 

Terebridae
Molluscs of the Atlantic Ocean
Molluscs of Angola
Invertebrates of Guinea
Invertebrates of North Africa
Invertebrates of West Africa
Gastropods described in 1822
Taxa named by Jean-Baptiste Lamarck